Fevertree Drinks plc, known as Fever-Tree, is a British producer of premium drink mixers, founded by Charles Rolls and Tim Warrillow in 2004.

The company's name comes from its initial product, a tonic water. Their tonic was flavoured with quinine, a chemical extracted from the bark of the South American cinchona tree. When introduced to India as a pharmaceutical to aid in reducing the fever associated with malaria, quinine was blended with soda water and sugar to make it more palatable, producing the earliest tonic water. The cinchona tree was referred to in India as fever tree.

Based in west London, Fever-Tree makes a variety of products, including tonic water, ginger beer and lemonade. As of March 2015, their products were exported to 50 countries.

In March 2013, the founders sold 25% of the company to Lloyds Development Capital. In November 2014, the company floated on the London Stock Exchange under the ticker symbol LSE:FEVR; the IPO valued Fever-Tree at £154.4m. , its market value had increased fourfold.

Products 
Fever-Tree's drink mixers have won "Outstanding Cold Beverage" in the sofi Awards in 2010, 2011, and 2012.

Products are manufactured in Somerset. The range includes:

 Indian Tonic Water 
 #1 Best Selling and #1 Most Trending Tonic Water by The World's 50 Best Bars Annual Report 2016
 Naturally Light Tonic Water
 Mediterranean Tonic Water
 Elderflower Tonic Water
 Aromatic Tonic Water
 Clementine & Cinnamon Tonic Water
 Sicilian Lemon Tonic
 Premium Soda Water
 Sicilian Lemonade
 Madagascan Cola
 Ginger Ale
 Spiced Orange Ginger Ale
 Smoky Ginger Ale
 Ginger Beer
 Naturally Light Ginger Beer
 Bitter Lemon

References

External links 
 

Companies listed on the Alternative Investment Market
Drink companies of England
Ginger ale
Soft drinks manufacturers
Food manufacturers based in London
Companies based in the London Borough of Hammersmith and Fulham